James Greig Reid (1 May 1890 – 22 April 1938) was a Scottish footballer who played for Lincoln City, Airdrieonians and Clydebank.

While playing as a centre forward for Airdrie, he finished as the top scorer in Scottish Football League Division One in the 1912–13 and 1913–14 seasons; he converted to an outside right after World War I to accommodate the emerging Hughie Gallacher, and was on the wing in the team that won the Scottish Cup in 1924; the Diamonds were also runners-up in Division One four consecutive times in that period.

Reid was selected three times by the Scottish national team (plus two further unofficial wartime internationals) and also played for the Scottish Football League XI, scoring six times in five appearances (and another in a wartime fundraising match).

References

External links

1890 births
Airdrieonians F.C. (1878) players
Partick Thistle F.C. players
Peebles Rovers F.C. players
Association football forwards
Clydebank F.C. (1914) players
Scotland international footballers
Scotland wartime international footballers
Scottish Football League players
Scottish Football League representative players
Scottish footballers
1938 deaths
Lincoln City F.C. players
People from Peebles
Sportspeople from the Scottish Borders
Scottish league football top scorers